William Forte Willett Jr. (November 27, 1869 – February 12, 1938) was a U.S. Representative from New York.

Biography
William Willett was born in Brooklyn, New York, on November 27, 1869.  He attended the public schools of his native city and then graduated from the law department of New York University, New York City, in 1895.  He was admitted to the bar the following year and commenced the practice of law in New York City.

Career
Willett was elected as a Democrat to the Sixtieth and Sixty-first Congresses (March 4, 1907 - March 3, 1911).

On January 18, 1909, Congressman Willett denounced President Theodore Roosevelt in a speech that was so outrageous that he was ordered to sit down, and the House voted 126 to 78 against allowing him to continue.  On January 27, the House, by voice vote, expunged the speech from the Congressional Record for "language improper and in violation of the privileges of debate".  He did not stand for renomination in 1910.

He was indicted in 1912 on charges that he paid Democratic Party leaders for a seat on the State Supreme Court. In 1913, Willett was convicted of conspiracy and "corrupt practices", specifically bribery. After exhausting his appeals he served 14 months in Sing Sing.

Willett then went into the real estate business.

Death
He died in New York City on February 12, 1938, and was interred in Evergreen Cemetery, Brooklyn, New York.

References 

1869 births
1938 deaths
20th-century American criminals
20th-century American politicians
American politicians convicted of bribery
American prisoners and detainees
Burials at the Cemetery of the Evergreens
Democratic Party members of the United States House of Representatives from New York (state)
Inmates of Sing Sing
New York (state) politicians convicted of crimes
New York University School of Law alumni
Politicians from Brooklyn